Karen Matevosyan (March 7, 1958, Yerevan, Armenian SSR, Union of Soviet Socialist Republics), armenologist, source scholar, art historian, Doctor of historical sciences (2008), professor (2015), deputy director of Matenadaran in Scientific Affairs (since 2018)., Acting Director of Matenadaran (from March 7, 2023)

His studies refer to the history, bibliography, manuscripts, architecture and art of medieval Armenia. A significant number of his works are publications devoted to the history and cultural heritage of Ani.

Biography
In 1979, he graduated from the Historical and Social Science Department of the Faculty of History at Pedagogical Institute after Khachatur Abovyan in Yerevan. In 1980–2004, he worked in the National Gallery of Armenia (since 1995 holding the position of the Scientific Secretary). Since 2005, he has been working at the Matenadaran, the Research Institute of Ancient Manuscripts after Mesrop Mashtots. Since 2009, he is the Head of the Art History and Scriptoriums Study Department, and the deputy director of Matenadaran for Scientific Affairs (since March 2018).

Scientific work
In 1989, Karen Matevosyan defended his PhD thesis (titled “The Scriptorium of the city Ani”)at the Institute of History of the National Academy of Sciences of the Republic of Armenia and received the scientific degree of Candidate of Historical Sciences. In 2008, he defended his Doctoral thesis (untitled “A Source-based study of the manuscripts of the Chronology of Samuel Anetsi”) at the Institute of History of the National Academy of Sciences of the Republic of Armenia and received the degree of Doctor of Historical Sciences.

Teaching Experience
In the years 1985-2001 and 2011-2014 Karen Matevosyan taught at the Gevorgian Seminary of the Mother See of Holy Etchmiadzin, in the years 2009-2022 he lectured at the Pedagogical University after Khachatur Abovyan. Professor since 2015.

Editorial work
1994-1996 chief editor of "Lusavorich" newspaper.
1997-2000 chief editor of Saint Etchmiadzin's bi-weekly "Christian Armenia".
Since 2001, founder and chief editor of "Knowledge" magazine.
2002-2008 founder and chief editor of three-monthly "Armenian Art" magazine.

Social work 
In the years 1991–2000, he was the vice-president of the Armenian Christian Culture "Momik" NGO,  in 2000-2007 president. Since 2009, a member of the Scientific Council of Matenadaran, since 2012, a member of the Professional Council awarding scientific degrees of the Institute of History of the National Academy of Sciences of the Republic of Armenia (specialization in "Historiography and Source Studies"), since 2019, a member of the management board of the National Library of Armenia, a member of the Publication Council of the Mother See Holy Etchmiadzin, since 2020, a member of the Scientific Board of the History Museum of Armenia.

Publications 
Karen Matevosyan is the author of 25 books (8 co-authored) and more than 114 scientific articles. See the list of publications here: www.armenianart.org

References

External links
Հավուց Թառի գրչության կենտրոնը, 
Անի մայրաքաղաք և կաթողիկոսանիստ ,
Սամվել Անեցին եւ նրա շարունակողները մի քանի վանքերի կառուցման մասին 

Armenian State Pedagogical University alumni
Armenian art historians
Armenian studies scholars
1958 births
Living people